This is a list of awards and nominations received by British musician Paul Epworth.

Academy Awards

Billboard Music Awards

BMI London Awards

BMI Pop Awards

BRIT Awards

BT Digital Music Awards

Critics' Choice Movie Awards

Golden Globes Awards

Grammy Awards

Houston Film Critics Society

Ivor Novello Awards

MTV Europe Music Awards

MTV's Song of the Year

MTV Video Music Awards

People's Choice Awards

Q Awards

Satellite Awards

Skatta Social TV Awards

Soul Train Music Awards

Swiss Music Awards

Teen Choice Awards

UK Music Video Awards

VEVOCertified Awards

World Soundtrack Academy Awards

References 

Epworth, Paul